The UMB World Three-cushion Championship is a professional carom billiards tournament in the discipline of three-cushion billiards, organized mostly annually by the Union Mondiale de Billard (UMB). Until 1953 it was organized by the UIFAB (Union Internationale des Federations d'Amateurs de Billard). During a dispute between the UMB and Billiards World Cup Association (BWA), the UMB decided not to organize the championship between 1988 and 1993. Instead the overall winner of the World Cup was announced as also the world champion.

From 1928 to 1958 and from 1985 to 1987, matches were played as a single frame with a run to 50 points (or 60 points between 1960 and 1984). From 1994 to 2011 the tournament was played in a set-system, the winner achieving the best of five. Since 2012 it has been changed back to a single frame with the run to 40 points.

Prize money and ranking points

Tournament records timeline

List of champions
This is the list of UMB three-cushion billiards world champions, from 1928 to present.

Medals (1928-2022)

See also
 CEB European Three-cushion Championship
 UMB World Three-cushion Championship for National Teams
 Three-Cushion World Cup
 UMB Women's World Three-cushion Championship

References

 
Three-cushion billiards competitions
World championships in carom billiards
Articles containing video clips
Recurring sporting events established in 1928
Annual sporting events